Velika Kosnica is a village in Croatia. It is connected by the D3 highway at the A3 interchange.

See also
Mala Kosnica
Petina, Croatia
Zagreb Airport

References

Populated places in Zagreb County
Velika Gorica